The People's Choice Awards for Favorite Band is one of the awards handed out at the People's Choice Awards. It was first awarded to Maroon 5 in 2012. The band is the most-nominated artist in the category together with Imagine Dragons. Both acts have earned a total of six nominations each. BTS is the most-awarded group in the category, having won four times.

Recipients

Artists with multiple nominations
6 nominations
 Maroon 5
 Imagine Dragons

5 nominations
 BTS
 Coldplay

4 nominations
 Twenty One Pilots
 Panic! at the Disco
 5 Seconds of Summer

3 nominations
 One Direction
 Jonas Brothers
 Blackpink

2 nominations
 Linkin Park
 OneRepublic
 Fifth Harmony
 The Chainsmokers
 CNCO
 Dan + Shay

References

Band